The University of Florida College of Medicine is the medical school of the University of Florida. It is part of the J. Hillis Miller Health Science Center, with facilities in Gainesville and Jacksonville, Florida. The school grants Doctor of Medicine (M.D.), Doctor of Medicine-Doctor of Philosophy (M.D.-Ph.D.), and Physician Assistant (P.A.) degrees to its graduates. Its primary teaching hospital is UF Health Shands Hospital with which the school shares a campus in Gainesville.

History

The college was officially established in 1956. The founding Dean of the college was Dr. George T. Harrell. Dr. Harrell also founded the College of Medicine at Pennsylvania State University, becoming the first person to found two medical schools.

In March 2009, the college received the largest donation in its history. Jerry and Judy Davis donated $20 million to the College of Medicine to support teaching, research and programs in cancer, with special emphasis on research in lymphoma, breast cancer, bone marrow and gastrointestinal cancer.

Rankings

U.S. News & World Report ranked the College of Medicine 36th out of 122 research-intensive medical schools in the U.S. in 2021.

The university's teaching hospital, UF Health Shands Hospital, is nationally ranked in 5 specialties.

The ARWU ranked UF's College of Medicine 51st among schools of medicine across the globe in 2012.

In December 2018 Expertscape recognized it as #4 in the world for expertise in Diabetes Mellitus Type 1.

The University of Florida College of Medicine was awarded $349 million in annual research expenditures in sponsored research for 2018.

Admissions

Admission to the University of Florida College of Medicine is considered to be highly competitive. For the M.D. class of 2015, 136 students enrolled out of 2,853 applicants. The class' undergraduate average GPA was 3.75, while the average MCAT was 31.06.

Deans of the College of Medicine

See also

 University of Florida
 J. Hillis Miller Health Science Center
 University of Florida College of Medicine-Jacksonville
 UF Health Shands Hospital
 UF Health Jacksonville
 McKnight Brain Institute
 UF Health Shands Cancer Hospital

References

External links
 Official University of Florida College of Medicine website
 Gainesville Sun info about the College
 Gainesville Sun Article about the College's rankings
 Interdisciplinary Programs by the College
 Alligator article about the rankings
 Medical Informatics about the College of Medicine
 Alligator article about the founder of the College
 U.S. News & World Report list of top medical schools for 2008

University of Florida
Medicine
Educational institutions established in 1956
Education in Alachua County, Florida
1956 establishments in Florida